Silvio Sérafin (3 April 1938 – 19 February 2021) was a French footballer who played as a defender. He was the older brother of fellow footballer Jean Sérafin.

Biography
Sérafin grew up in Tucquegnieux and spent his teenage years as a miner in Lorraine. He and his brother Jean were prolific football prospects and were recruited by clubs such as FC Metz, FC Nancy, Stade de Reims, and Valenciennes FC. He joined the club FC Nancy in 1957 at the age of 19. He was then loaned to US Forbach and RC Franc-Comtois from 1961 to 1963 before returning to Nancy the latter year. However, once the club was relegated into Division 2, he left for Angers SCO of Division 1 in 1964. In 1966, he joined Angoulême-Soyaux Charente, where he would play the remainder of his professional career. In 1970, the club refused to renew his contract, despite the fact that he wanted to stay.

He left the team in 1975. After his professional career, he operated a café in Châtellerault for 20 years, while continuing to play amateur football for various teams throughout the 1980s and 90s.

Silvio Sérafin died in Châtellerault on 19 February 2021 at the age of 82.

References

1938 births
2021 deaths
French footballers
FC Nancy players
US Forbach players
Racing Besançon players
Angers SCO players
Angoulême Charente FC players
Sportspeople from Meurthe-et-Moselle
Sportspeople from Moselle (department)
Association football defenders
Footballers from Grand Est